Outer Nørrebro Culture Bureau (YNKB) is a Danish artists group.

YNKB is an artists group based in outer Nørrebro, a former working-class neighborhood in Copenhagen, Denmark, which is home to a large percentage of immigrants. YNKB seeks inspiration in human interrelations in outer Noerrebro for activities involving the neighborhood, and wishes to relocate artistic activity to local communities. YNKB has hosted events including: video and film screenings, lectures, debates, and concerts. YNKB's space is also used for meetings and swopshop sessions.

YNKB has participated in: In-Tangible Exchange (Museum of Contemporary Art and Design, San Jose, Costa Rica, 2003); Utopia Station (Martha Rosler's pavillon, Venice Biennale, Italy, 2003); The Prague Biennial 1 (Czech Republic, 2003); and Kontoret for Jordforbindelse (The Museum of Contemporary Art, Roskilde, Denmark, 2004).

External links
YNKB
Prague Biennial

References 

Danish contemporary artists
Danish artist groups and collectives